Hoehneella is a genus of flowering plants from the orchid family, Orchidaceae. There are two known species, both endemic to Brazil.
It is named after Brazilian botanist F. C. Hoehne.

Hoehneella gehrtiana (Hoehne) Ruschi - São Paulo
Hoehneella heloisae Ruschi - Espírito Santo

See also 
 List of Orchidaceae genera

References 

 Pridgeon, A.M., Cribb, P.J., Chase, M.A. & Rasmussen, F. eds. (1999). Genera Orchidacearum 1. Oxford Univ. Press.
 Pridgeon, A.M., Cribb, P.J., Chase, M.A. & Rasmussen, F. eds. (2001). Genera Orchidacearum 2. Oxford Univ. Press.
 Pridgeon, A.M., Cribb, P.J., Chase, M.A. & Rasmussen, F. eds. (2003). Genera Orchidacearum 3. Oxford Univ. Press
 Berg Pana, H. 2005. Handbuch der Orchideen-Namen. Dictionary of Orchid Names. Dizionario dei nomi delle orchidee. Ulmer, Stuttgart

External links 

Orchids of Brazil
Zygopetalinae genera
Zygopetalinae